Aleksandr Lvovich Shalagin (born 9 September 1982) is a Russian professional football coach and a former player. He is an assistant coach with FC Ural Yekaterinburg.

Club career
He played two seasons in the Russian Football National League for FC Ural Yekaterinburg.

References

External links
 

1982 births
Living people
Russian footballers
Association football midfielders
FC Ural Yekaterinburg players
Russian football managers
FC Uralets Nizhny Tagil players